The Copa Digeder 1988 was the 18th edition of the Chilean Cup tournament. The competition started on March 19, 1988, and concluded on July 6, 1988. first and second-level teams took part in the tournament. Colo-Colo won the competition for their sixth time, beating Unión Española 1–0 in the final. The points system in the first round awarded 3 points for a win. In the event of a tie, each team was awarded 1 point, and an additional point was awarded to the winner of a penalty shoot-out.

Calendar

Group Round

Group 1

Group 2

Group 3

Group 4

Quarter-finals

Semifinals

Final

Top goalscorer
Ramón Pérez (Palestino) 17 goals

See also
 1988 Campeonato Nacional
 Segunda División

Sources
Revista Minuto 90, (Santiago, Chile) March–July 1988 (scores & information)
Revista Triunfo, (Santiago, Chile) March–July 1988 (scores & information)

Copa Chile
Chile
1988